Church of St Peter is a Grade I listed church in Milton Bryan, Bedfordshire, England. It became a listed building on 23 January 1961.

History
St Peter's has Norman origins, its history can be traced back to the 11th century. Its construction was originally of a more simplistic nature, consisting of only a nave, chancel, bell-cot and a wooden porch. After changes in the 14th and 17th Centuries, the building also exhibits both north and south transepts, a tower and a stained-glass window dedicated to Joseph Paxton. The Church also features the 'Inglis Chapel', deriving its namesake from the Inglis family; Hugh Inglis (a former Baron of Milton Bryan) made significant repairs and additions to the building during the 1800s and selected Robert Smirke as the architect.

Activity 
The Church maintains regular services, including Holy Communion, alongside community events such as jumble sales and 'Café Church' where refreshments are provided for an optional donation.

See also

Grade I listed buildings in Bedfordshire

References

Church of England church buildings in Bedfordshire
Grade I listed churches in Bedfordshire